Blue Fox may refer to:

Arts and entertainment
 Blue Fox (Marc), or Fox, a 1911 painting by Franz Marc
 The Blue Fox (1921 film), an American serial
 The Blue Fox (1938 film), a German comedy
 The Blue Fox (novel), a 2003 novel by Sjón
 Blue Fox Entertainment, an American film distributor
 Blue Fox, a 1984 Enix home computer game
 Blue fox, a type of fictional animal in the TV series The Animals of Farthing Wood

Sports
 Herning Blue Fox, a Danish ice hockey team
 Blue Fox, a Finnish women's floorball club in the F-liiga

Other uses
 Blue Fox Theatre, a historic cinema in Grangeville, Idaho, US
 Arctic fox (Vulpes lagopus), whose coat can appear blue during seasonal changes
 Ferranti Blue Fox, an airborne radar used in the BAe Sea Harrier
 Blue Fox (nuclear weapon), a British Rainbow Code project
 The Blue Fox, one of the "blue" pubs and inns in Grantham, England